Ravenhill is a surname, and may refer to:

Alice Ravenhill, Canadian educational pioneer
George Ravenhill, English soldier who received the Victoria Cross
Leonard Ravenhill, British revivalist and teacher at Last Days Ministries
Mark Ravenhill, English playwright
Philip Ravenhill (1828–1891), British Royal Engineer 
Ricky Ravenhill, English professional footballer